At the 1984 Summer Olympics, 20 wrestling events were contested. There were 10 weight classes in each of the freestyle wrestling and Greco-Roman wrestling disciplines. Competition took place at the arena at the Anaheim Convention Center in Anaheim, California.

Background
The dominant Soviet Union which won 12 gold wrestling gold medals in Montreal 1976 was notably absent due to the boycott.

Medal summary

Freestyle

Greco-Roman

Medal table

Participating nations

A total of 267 wrestlers from 44 nations competed at the Los Angeles Games:

See also
 Wrestling at the Friendship Games

References

Sources
 

 
1984 in sport wrestling
1984 Summer Olympics events
1984
Wrestling in Los Angeles